{{DISPLAYTITLE:Mannitol 2-dehydrogenase (NADP+)}}

In enzymology, a mannitol 2-dehydrogenase (NADP+) is an enzyme that catalyzes the chemical reaction

D-mannitol + NADP+  D-fructose + NADPH + H+

Thus, the two substrates of this enzyme are D-mannitol and NADP+, whereas its 3 products are D-fructose, NADPH, and H+.

This enzyme belongs to the family of oxidoreductases, specifically those acting on the CH-OH group of donor with NAD+ or NADP+ as acceptor. The systematic name of this enzyme class is D-mannitol:NADP+ 2-oxidoreductase. This enzyme is also called mannitol 2-dehydrogenase (NADP+). This enzyme participates in fructose and mannose metabolism.

Structural studies

As of late 2007, only one structure has been solved for this class of enzymes, with the PDB accession code .

References

 
 

EC 1.1.1
NADPH-dependent enzymes
Enzymes of known structure